Robert James Rallison (born May 14, 1996), known online as TheOdd1sOut, is an American YouTuber, cartoonist, animator, author, and voice actor. He is known for producing storytime animations on his YouTube channel and being the co-creator, executive producer, and co-star of the Netflix animated series Oddballs.

Personal life 

Robert James Rallison was born in Chandler, Arizona, on May 14, 1996, to a Mormon family. His mother is author Janette Rallison. He has a twin sister, Faith, and three other siblings: Luke, Kate, and Arianna.

He attended Perry High School in Gilbert, Arizona. According to Rallison, he did not have any formal training in drawing, but had wanted to be a cartoonist as a child.

In 2018, Rallison moved to Glendale, California.

Career

Webcomics
Rallison's first published illustrated works were webcomics, under the title TheOdd1sOut. He uploaded the first comic strip onto Tumblr in June 2012, when he was 16. After 100 comics, he had amassed 100 followers, and it took him about a year to settle into his art style. By September 2016 he had written around 400 strips. Rallison described the characters in his comics as "marshmallow people" because of their white, roundish look. His comics tended to focus on lighthearted themes, such as taking famous puns literally, or poking fun at social cliches.

YouTube

On August 30, 2014, just over two years after starting his webcomic, Rallison started his YouTube channel as theodd1sout comic. In his animated videos, which feature the same "marshmallow people" as the webcomic, he talks about his life story, his thoughts, and opinions. His first video was titled "A Book I Made as a Kid", looking at a short story he made while in elementary school. In March 2016, his channel reached 100,000subscribers. In April 2016, his channel gained over 278,000subscribers, giving him a total of over 400,000subscribers. In July 2016, his channel reached 1 million subscribers. At some point, Rallison dropped out of college to make videos full-time.

On December 2, 2017, Rallison created a second channel, TheOdd2sOut, in which non-animation content is uploaded, i.e gaming. TheOdd2sOut amassed 1 millionsubscribers in April 2018, and TheOdd1sOut reached 10million subscribers in January 2019.

Collaborations
Rallison has collaborated with others to produce two songs and their accompanying music videos: "Life is Fun" in July 2018 with David Brown from Boyinaband; and "Good Person" in December 2020 with Joel Berghult from RoomieOfficial.

His animated character appeared in the credits scene of YouTube Rewind: The Shape of 2017 and in YouTube Rewind 2018: Everyone Controls Rewind where he has a speaking role.
In March 2019, Rallison was in MrBeast's $200,000 YouTuber Battle Royale video. He was on a team with Jaiden Animations and Anthony Padilla and they won the first round. Rallison gave the earnings he made from the YouTuber Battle Royale to #TeamTrees, a non-profit started by MrBeast that aimed to plant 20 million trees by the end of 2019.

Other work
Rallison wrote a book titled The Odd 1s Out: How to Be Cool and Other Things I Definitely Learned from Growing Up, which was released in July 2018. It was ranked No. 12 in the "trade paperback" category on Publishers Weeklys August 13, 2018, bestseller list.

Rallison also worked on the board game Can't Catch Harry, and, on November 22, Rallison announced and released his mobile game named TheOdd1sOut: Let's Bounce!.

In June 2022, Rallison announced that an animated series, Oddballs, based on his character, would premiere on Netflix later in the year.

Public image
As of December 2022, Rallison's main YouTube channel had over 18.5million subscribers, and his secondary channel had over 2.7million subscribers.

Foodbeast writer Peter Pham called Rallison's three videos about working at Subway (which Rallison satirically refers to as "Sooubway") as "amazing" and "hilarious".

In 2017, Dave Trumbore of Collider named Rallison one of five YouTubers who were "poised for mainstream success". In 2018, Kristin Brantley of Culturess reviewed his channel and webcomics favorably, writing, "You'll be glued to the screen watching all of these hilarious clips and reading all his great comics."

Awards and nominations

Books
TheOdd1sOut: How to Be Cool and Other Things I Definitely Learned from Growing Up (July 2018)
TheOdd1sOut: The First Sequel (March 2020)

Discography
 "Life is Fun" (with Boyinaband) (2018)
 "Good Person" (featuring Roomie) (2020)

Filmography

References

External links

 

Living people
American webcomic creators
Animators from Arizona
American YouTubers
YouTube channels launched in 2014
1996 births
YouTube animators
People from Chandler, Arizona
People from Glendale, California
Comedy YouTubers
21st-century American male writers
21st-century American comedians
American male comedians
American male voice actors
21st-century American writers